Siberian State University of Telecommunications and Informatics is a state university in Oktyabrsky District of  Novosibirsk, Russia. It was founded in 1953.

History
In the fall of 1953, the Novosibirsk Electrotechnical Institute of Communications was opened in Novosibirsk. It consisted of the Faculty of Radio Communication and Broadcasting and the Faculty of Telephone and Telegraph. The first year of enrollment contained 300 students taught by 50 teachers.

In 1998, the institute was renamed into Siberian State University of Telecommunications and Informatics.

Faculties
 Faculty of Automatic Telecommunications
 Faculty of Multiservice Telecommunication Systems
 Faculty of Mobile Radio Communication and Multimedia
 Faculty of Informatics and Computer Engineering
 Faculty of Humanities

External links
 Anniversary of SibGUTI. Library of Siberian Local History.

Education in Novosibirsk
Oktyabrsky District, Novosibirsk
Educational institutions established in 1953
1953 establishments in the Soviet Union
Universities in Novosibirsk Oblast